Iztok Kapušin  (born 29 April 1974) is a Slovenian football manager and former player.

References

External links
NZS profile 

1974 births
Living people
People from Brežice
Yugoslav footballers
Slovenian footballers
Association football defenders
Slovenian expatriate footballers
Slovenian expatriate sportspeople in Austria
Expatriate footballers in Austria
Slovenian PrvaLiga players
NK Domžale players
NK Krka players
NK Krško players
NK Zagorje players
NK Hrvatski Dragovoljac managers
NK Celje managers
Slovenian expatriate sportspeople in Croatia
Slovenian football managers
Slovenian expatriate football managers
Expatriate football managers in Croatia